Cicindela lengi, the blowout tiger beetle, is a species of flashy tiger beetle in the family Carabidae. It is found in North America.

Subspecies
These three subspecies belong to the species Cicindela lengi:
 Cicindela lengi jordai Rotger, 1974 (Jorda's tiger beetle)
 Cicindela lengi lengi W. Horn, 1908 (blowout tiger beetle)
 Cicindela lengi versuta Casey, 1913 (blowout tiger beetle)

References

Further reading

 
 

lengi
Articles created by Qbugbot
Beetles described in 1908